Leland P. Cowan is a CBS News National Correspondent for the CBS Evening News and a substitute anchor for CBS Sunday Morning.

Biography
Cowan was born in Salt Lake City, Utah, a son of Leland B. Cowan, a surgical and radiation oncologist, and Constance W. Cowan.  He is a 1988 graduate of the University of Washington with a double major in communications and speech communications. He is married to Molly Palmer, a television associate producer and daughter of television news correspondent John Palmer and writer Nancy Doyle Palmer. They live in Santa Monica and have two children.

Cowan was a frequent correspondent for NBC Nightly News with Brian Williams. Prior to joining NBC News, he was a reporter for CBS News in the CBS NEWSPATH division. He previously worked for NBC affiliate WLWT in Cincinnati, CBS affiliate WWMT in Kalamazoo, Michigan, KCOY in Santa Maria, California and KIEM in Eureka, California.

References

People from Salt Lake City
University of Washington College of Arts and Sciences alumni
American television reporters and correspondents
Living people
American male journalists
CBS News people
Year of birth missing (living people)